Gregor Stähli (born 28 February 1968 in Zürich) is a Swiss skeleton racer who has competed since 1989. He won two bronze Winter Olympic medals in the men's skeleton, earning them in 2002 and 2006.

Stähli also won ten medals at the FIBT World Championships, with three golds (men's skeleton: 1994, 2007, 2009), four silvers (men's skeleton: 1992, 2000, 2005, Mixed team: 2009), and three bronzes (men's skeleton: 1990, 1993; mixed team: 2007). He was overall men's Skeleton World Cup champion in 2001–02.

Stähli suffered a thigh injury during the World Cup competition in Lake Placid, New York on 20 November 2009 which eventually forced his withdrawal from the 2010 Winter Olympics in Vancouver eight weeks later.

External links
 
 
 
 
 
 "Staehli to miss Vancouver Games" . UniversalSports.com. 15 January 2010. Accessed 28 January 2010.
 
 Men's skeleton Olympic medalists since 1928 (sports123.com)
 
 

1968 births
Living people
Swiss male skeleton racers
Skeleton racers at the 2002 Winter Olympics
Skeleton racers at the 2006 Winter Olympics
Olympic skeleton racers of Switzerland
Olympic bronze medalists for Switzerland
Olympic medalists in skeleton
Medalists at the 2006 Winter Olympics
Medalists at the 2002 Winter Olympics
Sportspeople from Zürich
20th-century Swiss people
21st-century Swiss people